Bognor Regis West & Aldwick is an electoral division of West Sussex in the United Kingdom and returns one member to sit on West Sussex County Council.

Extent
The division covers the western half of the town of Bognor Regis; the communities of Aldwick and West Meads; and the northern part of Rose Green.

It comprises the following Arun District wards: Aldwick East Ward, the northern part of Aldwick West Ward and Marine Ward; and of the following civil parishes: the eastern part of Aldwick and the southwestern part of Bognor Regis.

Election results

2013 Election
Results of the election held on 2 May 2013:

2009 Election
Results of the election held on 4 June 2009:

2005 Election
Results of the election held on 5 May 2005:

References
Election Results - West Sussex County Council

External links
 West Sussex County Council
 Election Maps

Electoral Divisions of West Sussex
Bognor Regis